The 1996–97 West Midlands (Regional) League season was the 97th in the history of the West Midlands (Regional) League, an English association football competition for semi-professional and amateur teams based in the West Midlands county, Shropshire, Herefordshire, Worcestershire and southern Staffordshire.

Premier Division

The Premier Division featured 17 clubs which competed in the division last season, along with one new club:
Wolverhampton United, promoted from Division One

Also, Darlaston changed name to Darlaston Town.

League table

References

External links

1996–97
9